Đorđe Ćurčić (born 17 April 2005), also credited to as Đorđe M. Ćurčić, is a Serbian professional basketball player for Borac Čačak of the Basketball League of Serbia and the ABA League.

Professional career 
Ćurčić grew up with a youth system of his hometown club Borac. On 3 December 2021, Ćurčić made his ABA League debut in a 80–66 win over Split with no records in a minute of playing time.

National team career 
In July 2022, Ćurčić was a member of the Serbia U-17 team at the FIBA Under-17 Basketball World Cup in Spain. Over seven tournament games, he averaged 8.1 points, 3.7 rebounds, and 2.1 assists per game.

References

External links 
 Player Profile at ABA League
 Player Profile at realgm.com
 Player Profile at proballers.com

2005 births
Living people
ABA League players
Basketball League of Serbia players
Basketball players from Čačak
KK Borac Čačak players
Serbian men's basketball players